Rungius may refer to:

 Carl Rungius (1869–1959), German-American wildlife artist
 Nicolaus Rungius (ca. 1560–1629), vicar of Keminmaa, Finland